Mingorría is a municipality located in the province of Ávila, Castile and León, Spain. According to the 2004 census (INE), the municipality has a population of 466 inhabitants. The origin of Mingorría is quite obscure; its names has, or it seems to have, some Basque roots: from Mendigorría, red hill in Basque language, but there are not definitive sings of that origin.
Landscape of Mingorría shows granite blocks and evergreen oaks in an open field. Climate is typically interior Mediterranean with cold winters (negative temperatures are very common), warm summers, and a very dry atmosphere.
As in other areas of Castile and León this place has lost its population since the sixties, when rural life started to decline in mainland Spain.

Farming was a part of traditional economy, but stonework was the most prevalent activity until early 1890s. This sector emerged after the opening of railway in 1870 allowing to export granite stonework to other regions.

Gallery

References

Municipalities in the Province of Ávila